George Otto Simms (4 July 1910 – 15 November 1991) was an archbishop in the Church of Ireland, and a scholar.

Early life and education
George Otto Simms was born on 4 July 1910 in North Dublin in Ireland to parents John Francis A Simms & Ottilie Sophie Stange both from Lifford, County Donegal, as per his birth Certificate. He also attended the Prior School in Lifford for a time and also attended Cheltenham College, a public school in the United Kingdom. He went on to study at Trinity College Dublin, where in 1930 he was elected a Scholar and graduated with a B.A. in classics in 1932 and a B.D in 1936. He later completed a Ph.D. in 1950.

Clerical career
He became a deacon in 1935 and a priest in 1936, beginning his ministry as a curate at St Bartholomew's, Clyde Road, Dublin under Canon W.C.Simpson.

Publications
 For Better, for Worse, 1945
 The Book of Kells: a short description, 1950
 (ed with E. H. Alton and P. Meyer) The Book of Kells (facsimile edn), Berne, 1951
 The Bible in Perspective, 1953
 Christ within Me, 1975
 Irish Illuminated Manuscripts, 1980
 In My Understanding, 1982
 Tullow's Story, 1983
 (with R. G. F. Jenkins) Pioneers and Partners, 1985
 Angels and Saints, 1988
 Exploring the Book of Kells, 1988
 Brendan the Navigator, 1989

References

 Daithí Ó Corráin, Rendering to God and Caesar: The Irish churches and the two states in Ireland, 1949–73, (Manchester: Manchester University Press, 2006).
 Lesley Whiteside: George Otto Simms: A Biography, (Gerrards Cross: Colin Smythe, 1990).

1910 births
1991 deaths
Alumni of Trinity College Dublin
Anglican archbishops of Armagh
Anglican archbishops of Dublin
Bishops of Cork, Cloyne and Ross
Deans of Cork
Honorary Fellows of Trinity College Dublin
People from Lifford
People from Templeogue
Scholars of Trinity College Dublin
20th-century Anglican archbishops in Ireland
People educated at the Royal and Prior School
Irish Anglican archbishops